Marc Edelman (born 1952, New York, N.Y.) is a professor of anthropology at Hunter College and the Graduate Center of the City University of New York. He was president of the American Ethnological Society from 2017 to 2019.

He has also taught or been a visiting researcher at the University of Costa Rica, Tashkent State University (Uzbekistan), Yale University, Princeton University, the Institute for Advanced Study, and the Instituto de Altos Estudios Nacionales (Ecuador).

Edelman received his B.A. (1975), M.A. (1978) and his Ph.D. (1985) in Anthropology from Columbia University. His research has analyzed agrarian change in Latin America, transnational social movements, rural development problems, historical and contemporary land grabbing, the rise of authoritarian populism, and the human rights of rural populations.

Publications

Books 
 2018	Global Land Grabbing and Political Reactions ‘From Below’ [with co-editors Ruth Hall, Saturnino M. Borras Jr., Ian Scoones, Ben White, and Wendy Wolford]. London: Routledge.  
 2017	Activistas empedernidos e intelectuales comprometidos: Ensayos sobre movimientos sociales, derechos humanos y estudios latinoamericanos. Quito: Editorial del Instituto de Altos Estudios Nacionales. 
 2016 	Political Dynamics of Transnational Agrarian Movements [with co-author Saturnino M. Borras, Jr.]. Halifax, Nova Scotia: Fernwood and Rugby, Warwickshire UK: Practical Action Publishing. 
 2016 	Estudios agrarios críticos: Tierras, semillas, soberanía alimentaria y los derechos de las y los campesinos. Quito: Editorial del Instituto de Altos Estudios Nacionales. 
 2016	Critical Perspectives on Food Sovereignty. Global agrarian transformations [with co-editors James C. Scott, Amita Baviskar, Saturnino M. Borras Jr., Eric Holt-Giménez, Deniz Kandiyoti, Tony Weis and Wendy Wolford]. London: Routledge. 
 2015 	Global Land Grabs: History, Theory and Method [with co-editors Carlos Oya and Saturnino M. Borras Jr.. Routledge 
 2008 	Transnational Agrarian Movements Confronting Globalization [with co-editors Saturnino M. Borras, Jr. and Cristóbal Kay]. London: Wiley-Blackwell. 
 2007 	Social Democracy in the Global Periphery: Origins, Challenges, Prospects [with co-authors Richard Sandbrook, Patrick Heller, and Judith Teichman]. Cambridge: Cambridge University Press 
 2005 	The Anthropology of Development and Globalization: From Classical Political Economy to Contemporary Neoliberalism [with co-editor Angelique Haugerud]. London: Blackwell. 
 1999	Peasants Against Globalization: Rural Social Movements in Costa Rica. Stanford: Stanford University Press. 
 1998	Ciencia social en Costa Rica: Experiencias de vida e investigación [with co-authors Fabrice Lehoucq, Steven Palmer, and Iván Molina] San José: Editorial de la Universidad Nacional & Editorial de la Universidad de Costa Rica,  
 1992	The Logic of the Latifundio: The Large Estates of Northwestern Costa Rica since the Late Nineteenth Century. Stanford: Stanford University Press. 
 1989	The Costa Rica Reader [with co-editor Joanne Kenen]. New York: Grove Weidenfeld.  
 1988 	Weder Schaf noch Wolf: Sowjetunion-Lateinamerika 1917-1987 [with co-author Klaus Fritsche] Bonn: Herausgeber und Vertrieb-Informationsstelle Lateinamerika.

References

Marc Edelman, ORCID

Marc Edelman, Google Scholar Profile

Marc Edelman, Department of Anthropology, Hunter College

Marc Edelman, Professor of Anthropology, CUNY Graduate Center

Living people
Academics from New York (state)
1952 births
City University of New York faculty